Rik de Voest and Łukasz Kubot were the defending champions but did not participate this year.
In the final, 2nd-seeded pair Johan Brunström and Jean-Julien Rojer defeated Pablo Cuevas and Dominik Hrbatý in two sets, by 6–2, 6–3.

Seeds

Draw

Finals

External links
Official website

UniCredit Czech Open
2009 Doubles